Urban planning in the Soviet Bloc countries during the Cold War era was dictated by ideological, political, social as well as economic motives. Unlike the urban development in the Western countries, Soviet-style planning often called for the complete redesigning of cities.

This thinking was reflected in the urban design of all communist countries. Most socialist systems exercised a form of centrally controlled development and simplified methods of construction outlined in the Soviet guidelines already at the end of the Stalinist period. The communist planning resulted in the virtually identical city blocks being erected across many nations, even if there were differences in the specifics between each country.

Soviet-style cities are often traced to Modernist ideas in architecture such as those of Le Corbusier and his plans for Paris. The housing developments generally feature tower blocks in park-like settings, standardized and mass-produced using structural insulated panels within a short period of time.

Beginnings of urban planning in communist countries

Many eastern European countries had suffered physical damage during World War II and their economies were in a very poor state. There was a need to reconstruct cities which had been severely damaged due to the war. For example, Warsaw, Poland, had been practically razed to the ground under the planned destruction of Warsaw by German forces after the 1944 Warsaw Uprising. The centre of Dresden, Germany, had been totally destroyed by the 1945 Allied bombardment. Stalingrad had been largely destroyed and only a small number of structures were left standing.

The financial resources of eastern European countries, after nationalization of industry and land, were under total government control. All development and investment had to be financed by the state. In line with their commitment to communism, the first priority was building industry.

Therefore, for the first ten to fifteen years, most resources were directed towards the development of industry and the reconstruction of destroyed cities. In most cases, this reconstruction was executed without any urban planning for several reasons. Firstly, reconstruction had to start immediately as there was not enough time to develop a detailed plan. Secondly, the man-power and expertise for developing urban plans in great numbers were not available.

Oftentimes, destroyed cites were not rebuilt as they were before. Rather, entirely new cities were constructed along the principles of Soviet Socialism. However, the historically significant structures in some large cities were rebuilt. Experts worked to make the restoration resemble the original as much as possible. For example, the old city centre in Warsaw, the Zwinger in Dresden, and many historic buildings in Budapest were restored to their pre-war beauty.

A notable exception is the building of the National Theatre of Bucharest, Romania, which was damaged by bombing in August 1944. Though part of the building was still standing, after taking complete power in 1947, the communist authorities decided to tear down the remains of the building.

In the late 1940s, the USSR developed a new type of high-rise. The first such buildings were built in Moscow: Moscow State University, Kotelnicheskaya Embankment Building, Kudrinskaya Square Building, Hilton Moscow Leningradskaya Hotel, Hotel Ukraina, Ministry of Foreign Affairs, Ministry of Heavy Industry. These were duplicated in some other countries, the main examples being the Palace of Culture and Science in Warsaw and the House of the Free Press in Bucharest. The Stalin Allee (subsequently named Karl-Marx-Allee) in East Berlin was also flanked by buildings having the same Stalinist style, though their concept was different from the Moscow high-rises. These buildings are mainly examples of a new architectural style, but did not involve urban planning to a significant extent, and there is no visible conceptual link between these buildings and their neighborhood.

Construction of these buildings required the demolition of the structures which were located on their sites. The most notorious was the demolition of the Cathedral of Christ the Saviour, erected in Moscow as a memorial of Napoleon's defeat. The site was required for the Palace of the Soviets, which was never built. The demolition of historic buildings, especially churches, to make way for the new communist structures was a general trait of communist urbanism. A more recent example was the Demolition of historical parts of Bucharest by Nicolae Ceauşescu who aimed to rebuild the capital in a socialist realist style.

In other cases, the Soviets preserved historic structures and attempted to erase their non-Soviet significance; instead, they focused on aesthetics and perceived beauty. For example, the Vilnius Cathedral was repurposed as an art museum after the Soviet Union retook Lithuania in 1944. Additionally, the names of streets in Vilnius were changed to more closely reflect Soviet values. Over time, the city began to expand, and in the 1978 Master Plan for Vilnius, new districts were proposed, most of which were residential. New private housing was prohibited from the city center and the old town.

Industrialization brought more people from rural areas to the cities.  As few new housing units were built immediately after the war, an already severe housing shortages became worse. Eventually, chronic housing shortages and overcrowding required an extensive program of new construction. As a result, most communist countries adopted the solution used in the USSR which included strict limits on the living space to which each person was entitled. Generally, each person was entitled to about 9-10 square meters (100 square feet). Often, more than one person had to share the same room. Two or more generations of the same family would often share an apartment originally built for only one nuclear family. There was no space allocated to separate living and dining areas. After the mid-1950s, new housing policies aimed at the mass construction of larger individual apartments.

First attempts of socialist city planning in Eastern Europe
In the process of socialist industrialization, industrial facilities were built not only near existing cities but also in areas where only small rural communities had existed. In such cases, new urban communities emerged in the vicinity of the industrial plants to accommodate the workers. This is the case of Nowa Huta (1949) in Poland, Dunaújváros (1950) in Hungary, and Oneşti (1952) in Romania.

After World War II, dam construction accelerated due to an abundance of new technology. The relocation of people caused by storage reservoirs on large rivers created the need for new communities. Many river-based traditional villages were demolished and their inhabitants relocated.  For instance, in Romania, the construction of the Izvorul Muntelui dam on the Bistriţa river required the relocation of several villages with a population of several thousand people.

These trends of the early post-war years were just a sign of what was to follow in the next decades when the constraints of the reconstruction had been overcome and development was undertaken on a much greater scale. However, the first projects highlighted the need for urban planning in the new localities. This also included the design of the entire infrastructure system such as roads, water supply and power supply and also social impact studies, as in many cases the life-style of the population was severely affected.  For example, often farmers whose land had been claimed for development would not get replacement farmland or compensation.

Urban development in the 1960s and 1970s 

In the big cities few new housing units were constructed and the existing units were overcrowded.  Around 1960 the USSR changed its policy and began an extensive program of construction of new apartment buildings. This trend was immediately followed by all communist countries in Eastern Europe.  The development of new neighborhoods in order to extend the housing capacity of cities required an extensive urban planning effort.  In most cities, new development took place on the outskirts of the existing cities, incorporating suburbs or undeveloped land into the city.  Also, in cities in which slums existed, the slums were redeveloped with modern housing units.

While the actual design and construction of the apartment buildings is not part of the urban planning exercise, the height and type of the buildings, the density of the buildings and other general characteristics were fixed by the planning exercise.  Besides, the entire development of the infrastructure had to be planned.  This included the transportation system and the roads, water supply, sewerage, power supply, shopping centers, schools and other infrastructure.  Flood control was also a concern for cities located in flood prone areas.  The planning also covered the industrial zones where new industries were to be located.

In some parts, urban problems were raised also due to other infrastructure, mainly to the development of waterways.  The construction of reservoirs on big rivers in the proximity of cities created new waterfronts which had to be developed.  This happened mainly in the Soviet Union, but also in other countries.  Also some urban planning was required in the downtown districts where new official buildings were constructed.  An example is the development of the area of the congress hall attached to the previous royal palace in the center of Bucharest.

While the main urban planning effort was concentrated on the newly developed areas, it also had to cover the old city, as many of the utilities were linked to the existing infrastructure.  After the first developments were completed, it became apparent that the cities had emerged in having new buildings at the periphery, while the center city had many decaying old buildings.  Meanwhile, in capitalist countries, private enterprise made construction in the inner cities possible, both by replacing older buildings with new structures and by renovating the existing ones.  This private enterprise process was practically non-existent in the communist countries, where the maintenance of the old houses was extremely poor.  Therefore, the difference between the inner and outer cities became quite visible in the USSR.

Planning of rural localities

The standardization of living (i.e. hot and cold running water, electricity, access to medicine and education, etc.) between the workers in the urban-cityscape and those in the rural-farming lands was an important piece of foundational Marxism–Leninism in the Soviet Union.  But by the early 1970s it became clear that the gradual evolution towards equal standards of living between urban and rural workers, as prescribed by Marxism–Leninism,  was lagging. Even more disparaging, significant developments in the quality of life for the villages of the European west greatly surpassed those in the communist east (the majority of which only had electricity).  Consequently, the USSR found it necessary to enact policy to improve the lives of villagers and advance its own villages to be more comparable to those in the west.

In the Soviet Union, this policy came about through the systematic construction of urban types of residences, mainly multi-story modern apartment blocks, built on the idea that these buildings could provide a degree of comfort that which the older peasant houses could not. As part of this plan, smaller villages (typically those with populations under 1000) were deemed irrational or inefficient and a variety of remedies could befall them. The mildest consequence was the village could be slated for reduction of services, given a timely notice of demolition, or the workers were asked voluntarily to leave.

Romania 

In time, large-scale demolitions and enormous reconstruction projects of villages, towns, and cities, in whole or in part, began to take shape. One of the largest and most ambitious of these developments began in 1974 with the goal of turning Romania into a "multilaterally developed socialist society". Urban planning, in Romania, began early on as displaced rural Romanians started flocking to the cities.  With a "blank canvas" of land, the communist regime hoped to create hundreds of urban industrial centers via investment in schools, medical clinics, housing, and industry.

Although the systematization plan extended, in theory, to the entire country, initial work centered in Moldavia.  It also affected such locales as Ceauşescu's own native village of Scorniceşti in Olt County: there, the Ceauşescu family home was the only older building left standing. The initial phase of systematization largely petered out by 1980, at which point only about 10 percent of new housing was being built in historically rural areas.

Given the lack of budget, in many regions systematization did not constitute an effective plan, good or bad, for development. Instead, it constituted a barrier against organic regional growth. New buildings had to be at least two stories high, so peasants could not build small houses. Yards were restricted to 250 square meters and private agricultural plots were banned from within the villages. Despite the obvious negative impact of such a scheme on subsistence agriculture, after 1981 villages were mandated to be agriculturally self-sufficient.

In the mid-1980s the concept of systematization found new life, applied primarily to the area of the nation's capital, Bucharest. Nearby villages were demolished, often in service of large-scale projects such as a canal from Bucharest to the Danube – projects which were later abandoned by Romania's post-communist government. Most dramatically, eight square kilometers in the historic center of Bucharest were leveled. The demolition campaign erased many monuments including 3 monasteries, 20 churches, 3 synagogues, 3 hospitals, 2 theaters and a noted Art Deco sports stadium. This also involved evicting 40,000 people with only a single day's notice and relocating them to new homes, in order to make way for the grandiose Centrul Civic and the immense Palace of the People, a building second in size only to the Pentagon.

Urban planning, especially the destruction of historic churches and monasteries, was protested by several nations, especially Hungary and West Germany, each concerned for their national minorities in Transylvania. Despite these protests, Ceauşescu remained in the relatively good graces of the United States and other Western powers almost to the last, largely because his relatively independent political line rendered him a useful counter to the Soviet Union in Cold War politics.

North Korea

Pyongyang, the capital of North Korea, has a downtown consisting of hundreds of high-rise apartments; however, most residents live in one-story buildings. North Korean citizens are provided housing by the government, and the quality of said housing is dependent on social status and household size. The city also has several extraordinarily expansive public spaces that are usually built around colossal monuments depicting Juche ideologies and/or monuments relating to Kim Jong-il.

Car ownership rates in Pyongyang are exceedingly low, and thus public transportation is vital to the city. A two-line subway system serves the city, with a network of elaborate stations, many with high ceilings and murals on their walls. Additionally, an expansive tram network covers the city. However, this public transit system does not expand into the outskirts of the city, inhibiting the formation of suburbs. One of the barriers to urbanization is that mobility within North Korea is heavily restricted by a registration system that requires people to obtain permission to go to areas that are not their locale. This makes it difficult for people who live in the countryside to move to a city, especially Pyongyang.

The People's Republic of China

The development of urban planning in the People's Republic of China (PRC) demonstrates a unique approach with Chinese characteristics. It started after communist takeover in the early 1950s. Through implementing new national urban policies, communist planners first introduced urban planning by applying centralised economic planning and industrialisation, especially in heavy industry.

Phase 1 (1949–1960)

In September 1952, there were two significant policies promulgated at an urban development conference: "construction of key cities in co-ordination with the national economic development programme" and "establishment of urban planning structure to strengthen city development".  These policies influenced China's urban planning significantly and at the same time were clearly defined by the main direction of the state – centralised economic and industrial development. During the First Five-year Plan (1953–58), the nation determined to develop 156 national key projects and 8 key industrial based cities.  In this period, vast physical development projects such as industrial bases, community facilities and housing for workers were established to achieve national needs and goals. All of these projects were carried out with the aid of the experts from the Soviet Union, particularly in terms of urban economic development and physical urban design. Urban planning at that time was mainly based on Soviet planning principles and the model of the post-war Soviet planning practice. Soviet-style communist planning concentrated on "formalistic street patterns and grand design for public buildings and monuments, huge public squares, and the predominance of master plans". The role of communist planners during this period was to focus on location selection of factories and industrial plants, arrangement of service facilities, design of the layout of industrial towns, functional division of urban land use zones and development of residential districts. Historic preservation was not a priority during this period of development. For example, Mao Zedong allowed Beijing's city walls to be demolished despite their historical significance in order to make room for other uses. The bricks from the walls were used in new development projects ranging from homes to a subway system. By the end of 1959, there were 180 cities, 1400 towns and more than 2,000 suburban residential settlements that had been project plans prepared under communist planning.

Phase 2 (1961–1976)

From 1960 to 1976, due to the political climate changing, the development of urban planning in communist China had suffered severe catastrophes: planning institutions had to cease, planners were assigned to support development in rural areas and planning documents were destroyed or discarded.   During the Great Leap Forward in the early 1960s, the utopian socialist planning development which particularly overemphasized large-scale urban development was seen as superior to Western-style planning.  However, due to the severe limitations of fiscal and labor resources, the first priority of urban planning was given to utopian socialist principles and then the second place to people's livelihood. Thus, giving little attention to the establishment of residential amenities and facilities, there were significant social and physical imbalances resulting in urban development. For instance, in the historic hutong neighborhoods in Beijing, courtyards were routinely replaced with new residential structures in order to accommodate more residents. By the end of this phase, about 30% of these courtyards had residential structures placed on them. Additionally, some anti-urban movements, a typical example being the People's Commune Movement, took place in communist China during this period. The purpose of setting up a commune, seen as a sub-community within cities, was to spread industrial values from urban to rural areas so that eventually the urban-rural gap would be eliminated.

Phase 3 (1977–1984)

In December 1978, a new era of economic and political reform had begun and accelerated. The major concern of urban planning in communist China shifted to the recognition of the function of cities. Consequently, a nationwide effective force to restore urban master plans was started. By the end of 1984, 241 cities and 1,071 counties throughout the nation as a whole completed their master plans.  Although these master plans might not technically fulfill the needs of urban development, they at least acted as guidelines to lead to planned and organised urban construction. In addition, some concepts of mega-metropolitan areas were established during this period.

Phase 4 (1985–present)

Contemporary urban planning in China is undergoing rapid, unprecedented urbanization and industrialization. In fact, China's urbanization rate was almost 50% by the year 2010, a stark contrast from previous decades. Based upon the current Chinese Urban and Rural Planning Act, two tiers – master plan and detailed plan – make up the Chinese urban planning system.  Reviewing the history of urban planning in China, the contemporary planning norm is neither simply following Soviet-style planning nor prohibiting advanced Western viewpoints of urban development. Urban renewal and redevelopment are common themes in contemporary Chinese planning. Large swathes of major cities are sometimes torn down at once to allow for new uses. In some cases, residents simply refuse to move out and developers have to adjust their plans accordingly. These residents have been dubbed "nail houses" or "dingzi hu", and there have been many famous cases of these holdouts in Chinese media.

Socialist Federal Republic of Yugoslavia

Post-WWII SFR Yugoslavia followed in line with the earlier urbanist experiments of the Soviet Union, and often delved in urban planning projects.
The best known example would be the Novi Zagreb (eng. "New Zagreb") urban development scheme of the Zagreb city – the capital of the Socialist republic of Croatia.
The district is mostly residential, consisting of blocks of flats and tower blocks that were built during the Socialist era (1945–1990). Although it is not as prestigious as downtown Zagreb, it has been praised for its good road network, public transportation connections and abundance of parks.

The project was started by the mayor of Zagreb, Većeslav Holjevac, as there was a large expanse of empty and undeveloped land south of the Sava river. The land was seized from the Captol church administration following the victory of the communist partisans in World War II. The mayor, seeing the opportunity to set in motion the building of a completely new and modern city under the socialist administration, promptly organized a team of urbanist designers and city planners.

The first complete solution for habitation with public and commercial contents was made for the neighborhood Trnsko by urbanists Zdenko Kolacio, Mirko Maretić and Josip Uhlik with horticulturist Mira Wenzler-Halambek in 1959–1960. It was followed by plans for neighborhood Zapruđe in 1962–1963, also made by Josip Uhlik.

The project was lauded as a great success, the district being known for its large amounts of foliage and recreational areas, including parks, museums and sports fields. A lot of care also went into building a modernized and efficient system of transportation and mass transit, such as tram and bus lines which were built by 1979. Lauding a typical Eastern bloc architectural style, it was designed to house a large capacity of residents, as the construction of the area was in part driven by the need for workforce to fuel the Zagreb industrialization projects recently put in motion. It also has examples of brutalist architecture, rare for the late period the area was constructed in.

See also

Eastern Bloc economies
Sotsgorod: Cities for Utopia
Soviet urban planning ideologies of the 1920s
Urban planning

Eastern bloc housing:
Panelák (Czechoslovakia)
Wielka płyta (Poland)
Panelház (Hungary)
Plattenbau (East Germany)
Ugsarmal bair (Mongolian People's Republic)
Systematization (Romania)
Khrushchyovka (Soviet Union)

References 

 Anania, Lidia; Luminea, Cecilia; Melinte, Livia; Prosan, Ana-Nina; Stoica, Lucia; and Ionescu-Ghinea, Neculai, Bisericile osândite de Ceauşescu. București 1977–1989 (1995). Editura Anastasia, Bucharest, . In Romanian. Title means "Churches doomed by Ceauşescu". This is very much focused on churches, but along the way provides many details about systematization, especially the demolition to make way for Centrul Civic.
 Bucica, Cristina. Legitimating Power in Capital Cities: Bucharest – Continuity Through Radical Change? (PDF), 2000.
 Chen, Xiaoyan: Monitoring and Evaluation in China's Urban Planning System: A Case Study of Xuzhou, 2009, Available from http://www.unhabitat.org/grhs/2009 
 Ilchenko M. Utopian spaces: Symbolic transformation of the "Socialist Cities" under post-Soviet conditions //Re-Imagining the city:  Municipality and Urbanity Today from a Sociological Perspective", Ed. by M. Smagacz-Poziemska, K. Frysztacki, A. Bukowski.  Jagiellonian University Press, 2017. P. 32-52
 Ilchenko M. “Socialist cities” under post-Soviet conditions: symbolic changes and new ways of representation // EUROPA REGIONAL, 25. 2017 (2018), 2, pp. 30–44
 Kirkby, R J. R. Urbanization in China: Town and Country in a Developing Economy, 1949-2000 A.d. New York: Columbia University Press, 1985. Print.
 Tang, Wing-Shing; Chinese Urban Planning at Fifty: An Assessment of the Planning Theory Literature Journal of Planning Literature 2000 14: 347-66
 Xie, Yichun and Costa F.J.: in: Cities, Volume 10, Issue 2, May 1993, Pages 103-114

Urban planning
Communist states
Eastern Bloc